The European Parliament election of 2004 took place on 12–13 June 2004.

The Olive Tree was the most voted list in Veneto with 26.7%, followed by Forza Italia (24.1%) and Liga Veneta–Lega Nord (14.1%).

Results
Source: Regional Council of Veneto

Elections in Veneto
2004 elections in Italy
European Parliament elections in Italy
2004 European Parliament election